Xavier Pujo (born 5 December 1977) is a retired French tennis player.

Pujo has a career high ATP singles ranking of 279 achieved on 14 July 2003. He also has a career high doubles ranking of 342 achieved on 18 February 2008.

Pujo has won 1 ATP Challenger doubles title at the 2007 Saint-Brieuc Challenger.

Challenger finals

Doubles: 3 (1–2)

References

External links
 
 

1977 births
Living people
French male tennis players
Tennis players from Paris
Tennis players from Bordeaux